Cai Yan ( 178 – post 206; or  170–215; or died  249), courtesy name Wenji, was a Chinese composer, poet, and writer who lived during the late Eastern Han dynasty of China. She was a daughter of Cai Yong. Her courtesy name was originally Zhaoji, but was changed to Wenji during the Jin dynasty to avoid naming taboo because the Chinese character for zhao in her courtesy name is the same as that in the name of Sima Zhao, the father of the Jin dynasty's founding emperor, Sima Yan. She spent part of her life as a captive of the Xiongnu until 207, when the warlord Cao Cao, who controlled the Han central government in the final years of the Eastern Han dynasty, paid a heavy ransom to bring her back to Han territory.

Life
She was married to Wei Zhongdao in 192 but her husband died shortly after their marriage and they did not have any children. Between 194 and 195, when China entered a period of chaos, the Xiongnu nomads intruded into Han territory, captured Cai, and took her back as a prisoner to the northern lands. During her captivity, she married the Xiongnu chieftain (the "Wise Prince of the Left") and bore him two sons. 12 years later, the Han Chancellor, Cao Cao, paid a heavy ransom in the name of Cai's father for her release. After Cai was freed, she returned to her homeland but left her children behind in Xiongnu territory. The reason Cao Cao wanted her back was that she was the sole surviving member of her clan and he needed her to placate the spirits of her ancestors.

After that, Cai married again, this time to Dong Si, a local government official from her hometown. However, when Dong Si committed a capital crime later, Cai pleaded with Cao Cao for her husband's acquittal. At the time, Cao Cao was hosting a banquet to entertain guests, who were stirred by Cai's distressed appearance and behaviour. She asked him if he could provide her with yet another husband. He pardoned Dong Si.

Later in her life, she wrote two poems describing her turbulent years.

Romance of the Three Kingdoms 
Cai Yan briefly appears in chapter 71 of the novel, Romance of the Three Kingdoms, a historical novel of 14th century which romanticizes previous events and during the Three Kingdoms period of China.

Cao Cao was on a march to battle with Liu Bei during the Hanzhong Campaign when he passed by Cai Yan's residence.

Cao Cao came to the gates with a few attendants. Upon hearing who the guest was, Cai Yan hurriedly raced to meet them, and after Cao Cao took a seat in the household, he noticed a tablet which contained mix-matched eight words that he couldn't interpret. Cai Yan pointed out that her father wrote it after hearing a specific tale. Yang Xiu, one of the men whom Cao Cao brought along, declared he knew the riddle on the tablet.

Cao Cao and his subordinates later left the house and Yang Xiu mentioned what the eight words meant using wordplay.

Legacy

Like her father, Cai Wenji was an established calligrapher of her time, and her works were often praised along with her father's. Her poems were noted for their sorrowful tone, which paralleled her hard life. The famous guqin piece Eighteen Songs of a Nomad Flute is traditionally attributed to her, although the authorship is a perennial issue for scholarly debate. The other two poems, both named "Poem of Sorrow and Anger", were known to be written by her.

The following is an excerpt from the "Poem of Sorrow and Anger" in five-character form:

In addition to her surviving poems, a volume of Collective Works of Cai Wenji was known to have survived until as late as the Sui dynasty but had been lost by the Tang dynasty.

Cai Wenji inherited some 4,000 volumes of ancient books from her father's vast collection. However, they were destroyed in the ravages of war. At Cao Cao's request, Cai recited 400 of them from memory and wrote them on paper.

Literary and artistic tributes

The stories of Cai reverberate primarily with feelings of sorrow, and inspired later artists to keep portraying her past. Her return to Han territory has been the subject of numerous paintings titled Cai Wenji Returns to Her Homeland by various painters since the Tang dynasty, as well as renderings in traditional Beijing opera.

In popular culture
Guo Moruo wrote a play on her life in 1959. In 1976, a crater on Mercury was named Ts'ai Wen-Chi after Cai Wenji, citing her as "Chinese poet and composer". In 1994, a crater on Venus was named Caiwenji after Cai Wenji, citing her as "Chinese poet".

Cai Wenji appears as a playable character in Koei's Dynasty Warriors: Strikeforce 2 and Dynasty Warriors 7 (her debut as a playable character in North American and European ports). She also appears in Koei's Romance of the Three Kingdoms video game series and in Dynasty Warriors 6: Empires as a non-playable character. She is also a playable character in Warriors Orochi 3 and Warriors Orochi 4. Her fighting style relies on casting energy balls and shock waves by strumming her harp.

See also

 Jian'an poetry
 Lists of people of the Three Kingdoms

Notes

References
 
  
 
  
  

170s births
2nd-century Chinese poets
2nd-century Chinese women writers
3rd-century Chinese poets
3rd-century Chinese women writers
3rd-century deaths
Ancient music composers
Cao Cao and associates
Cao Wei musicians
Cao Wei poets
Cao Wei writers
Chinese women composers
Chinese women poets
Guqin players
Han dynasty poets
Han dynasty musicians
Musicians from Henan
Poets from Henan
Writers from Kaifeng
Year of birth unknown
Year of death unknown